Luis Hurtado (born 24 January 1994) is a Colombian professional footballer who plays as a goalkeeper.

International career
José Pékerman called up Hurtado for a training squad with the senior Colombia squad in February 2016.

References

External links 

 

1994 births
Living people
Colombian footballers
Colombia under-20 international footballers
Colombia youth international footballers
Categoría Primera A players
Categoría Primera B players
Deportivo Cali footballers
Atlético F.C. footballers
Real Cartagena footballers
Deportivo Pereira footballers
Deportivo La Guaira players
Fortaleza C.E.I.F. footballers
Association football goalkeepers
Footballers at the 2016 Summer Olympics
Olympic footballers of Colombia
Footballers from Cali
21st-century Colombian people